Ricardo (born Ricardo Larrivée on March 12, 1967)  is a television host and a food writer who lives in Quebec, Canada. He hosts the television show Ricardo on Radio-Canada and previously hosted Ricardo and Friends on Food Network Canada.

Early life and education
In the 1980s, Larrivée enrolled in the Institut de tourisme et d'hôtellerie du Québec (ITHQ), a hospitality institute in Quebec, where he studied hotel management. He studied communications in Ottawa.

Career
Larrivée moved to Regina, Saskatchewan, and accepted a job as a technician at Radio-Canada.  He created both simple and elaborate dishes in his spare time and gained a reputation as a good cook. He was hired to present a food show on Radio-Canada. The Canadian Broadcasting Corporation was experiencing lay-offs, however, and Larrivée was one of those let go.

Larrivée moved back to Montreal and had the opportunity to share his recipes while working as a food reporter for television, radio and newspapers. At Radio-Canada, he contributed to several television shows, including Menu à la carte, Pêché mignon, Secrets de famille, Indicatif présent, Christiane Charrette and Beau temps pour s'étendre, in addition to appearing on Saisons de Clodine on the TVA television network. He also wrote a column in the lifestyle section of the daily newspaper La Presse and he continues to be a regular collaborator in the Saturday edition.

In 2002, Larrivée created a new TV show, Ricardo, which is shot in his home kitchen in Chambly, Quebec. He also begun to publish a magazine at the same time. This show became the longest-running cooking show in Canada. In 2006, Ricardo and Friends began to run on Food Network and lasted to three years. His cooking show employs about 125 people and is shown in about 160 countries.

Larrivée and his wife, Brigitte Coutu, operate a company headquartered in Saint-Lambert where recipes are tested and the magazines are created. Over the years, he published many books. Since 2009, he also has his own website.

In 2014, Larrivée was named a Member of the Order of Canada. The same year, Ricardo opened a new headquarters in a Montreal suburb. He has operated a restaurant in the greater Montreal area since 2016, named Café Ricardo, which will later expands to three cafés.

Television shows

Books
Ma cuisine weekend (La Presse August 5, 2004)
La chimie des desserts: 60 recettes de Ricardo PER Christina Blais (La Presse, 2007)
Ricardo - Parce qu'on a tous de la visite (La Presse, October 2008)
Weekend Cooking co-written with Christian LaCroix (Whitecap Books April 5, 2006)
Meals for every occasion (2009)
La mijoteuse - de la lasagne à la crème brûlée (2012)
Slow Cooker Favourites (2013)
La Mijoteuse 2 (2015)
Un Québécois dans votre cuisine, in France (2016)
Mon premier livre de recettes (La Presse, 2015)
Slower is Better, (HarperCollins, 2016)
Plus de légumes (2018)
Ultimate Slow Cooker (2018)
Le Quiz des aliments (2019)
Vegetable First (2019)
À la plaque (2020)
Sheet Pan Everything (2021)

Awards and nominations

References

External links
Official website
Ricardo on Radio-Canada.ca 

1967 births
Living people
Canadian male chefs
Canadian restaurateurs
Canadian television chefs
French Quebecers
Members of the Order of Canada
People from Chambly, Quebec
Television personalities from Montreal